Oryza latifolia, the broadleaf rice, is a widespread species of grass (family Poaceae). It is native to wetter areas of Latin America and the Caribbean, and has been introduced to India, Bangladesh, Myanmar, Laos, and Vietnam. A facultative aquatic perennial, if flooded it can adapt by growing considerably taller.

References

latifolia
Flora of Mexico
Flora of Central America
Flora of Cuba
Flora of Haiti
Flora of the Dominican Republic
Flora of Puerto Rico
Flora of the Leeward Islands
Flora of Trinidad and Tobago
Flora of northern South America
Flora of western South America
Flora of North Brazil
Flora of West-Central Brazil
Flora of South Brazil
Flora of Paraguay
Flora of Northeast Argentina
Plants described in 1813